The UEFA European Under-18 Championship 1983 Final Tournament was held in England.

Qualification

Group 2

Group 13

Other Groups

|}

Teams
The following teams qualified for the tournament:

 
 
 
  (host)

Group stage

Group A

Group B

Group C

Group D

Semifinals

Third place match

Final

External links
Results by RSSSF

UEFA European Under-19 Championship
1983
Under-18
Under-18
May 1983 sports events in the United Kingdom
1983 sports events in London
1983 in youth association football